This is a list of convoy codes used by the Allies during World War II There were over 300 convoy routes organized, in all areas of the world; each was designated by a two- or three letter code. List of Allied convoys during World War II by region provides additional information.


A - B - C - D - E - F - G - H - I - J - K - L - M - N - O - P - Q - R - S - T - U - V - W - X - Y - Z

A

B

C

D

E

F

G

H

I

J

K

L

M

N

O

P

Q

R

S

T

U

V

W

X

Y

Z

References
 Arnold Hague: The Allied Convoy System 1939–1945 (2000)  (Canada).  (UK)
 CODENAMES: Operations of World War 2. * codenames.info

External links
 listing on Convoyweb
 listing on U-Boat.net 

.
Allied convoy codes

South Atlantic convoys of World War II